Graham Briggs (born 14 July 1983) is a British road racing cyclist, who currently rides for British amateur team Clancy Briggs Cycling Academy.

Career
Born in Rossington, Doncaster, South Yorkshire, Briggs initially played football as a youngster before switching to cycling, initially off-road as a cyclo-cross rider and then the discipline of mountain biking, until the foot and mouth crisis of 2001. He competed for Great Britain in the Under-23 road race at the 2003 UCI Road World Championships in Hamilton, Ontario, Canada. The majority of his road racing career has been spent in city centre competitions leading to successes in the Elite Circuit Race Series in recent years. 

Briggs is classed as a sprinter and was the winner of the British National Circuit Race Championships in 2011.

Briggs left  at the end of the 2013 season, and joined  for the 2014 season; his third spell with the latter squad.

Graham Briggs is a co-founder of the Clancy Briggs Cycling Academy with the mission "to move a generation of children, putting the bicycle back at the heart of childhood play, forming lifelong habits that will deliver benefits for health and the environment for years to come."

Major results

2001
 3rd Road race, National Junior Road Championships
2007
 5th Overall Girvan Three Day
2008
 3rd Blackpool Grand Prix Circuit Race
 3rd Clayton Velo Spring Classic
 7th Overall Tour du Loir-et-Cher
 8th National Criterium Championships
2009
 1st Round 1 – Milton Keynes, Tour Series
 1st Stage 2 Girvan Three Day
 2nd Blackburn Grand Prix
 4th Brighouse Circuit Race
 4th Warwick Town Centre Race
 7th Colne Grand Prix
 8th East Yorkshire Classic Circuit Race
 10th Tour of the Reservoir
2010
 2nd Blackburn Grand Prix
 3rd Dumfries Bike Fest Grand Prix
 7th Dumfries Elite Circuit Series Race
 7th Newport Nocturne
2011
 1st  National Criterium Championships
 2nd Wales Open Criterium
 2nd Glade Spring Road Race
 4th Smithfield Nocturne
 6th Jock Wadley Memorial
2012
 1st Overall British Cycling Elite Circuit Race Series
1st Brighouse Circuit Race
1st Wales Open Criterium
2nd Colne Grand Prix
5th East Yorkshire Classic
10th Sheffrec CC Spring Road Race
2013
 2nd Monsal Hill-Climb
 4th Colne Grand Prix
 4th Wales Open Criterium
 10th Ryedale Grand Prix
2014
 1st  Overall Tour du Loir et Cher
1st Stage 3
 1st Legstretchers Memorial to Betty Pharoah Road Race
 1st Round 2 – Barrow-in-Furness, Tour Series
 1st Milk Race
 1st Colne Grand Prix
 1st Wales Open Criterium
 2nd National Criterium Championships
 2nd Eddie Soens Memorial
 2nd Newport Nocturne
 3rd Beverley Grand Prix
 3rd Jock Wadley Memorial Road Race
 5th Overall New Zealand Cycle Classic
 10th Stockton Grand Prix
2015
 1st Chepstow Grand Prix
 1st Wales Open Criterium
 2nd National Criterium Championships
 3rd Stockton Grand Prix
 3rd Grand Prix of Wales
 3rd Hitter Road Race
 8th Leicester Castle Classic
2016
 1st Round 3 - Edinburgh, Tour Series

 2nd - Aberystwyth, Tour Series
 3rd - Stevenage, Tour Series
 1st - Colne, Tour Series
 2nd - Stage 2, Tour of Britain
2017
1st - Croyden, Tour Series
3rd - Stevenage, Tour Series
3rd - Rydale Grand Prix
2nd - London Nocturne
2018
9th - Prologue, Herald Sun Tour
3rd - Aberystwyth, Tour Series
1st - Rydale Grand Prix

References

External links
 
 
 

1983 births
Living people
People from Rossington
British male cyclists
Sportspeople from Doncaster